Nikolai Uruzmakovich Khudiyev (born 15 May 1949) is a Russian professional football coach and a former player.

External links
 

1949 births
Sportspeople from Vladikavkaz
Living people
Soviet footballers
Association football defenders
FC Spartak Vladikavkaz players
FC Torpedo Moscow players
PFC CSKA Moscow players
FC Lokomotiv Moscow players
Soviet football managers
Russian football managers
Étoile Sportive du Sahel managers
FC Spartak Vladikavkaz managers
FC Asmaral Moscow managers
Russian Premier League managers
Russian expatriate football managers
Expatriate football managers in Tunisia
Russian expatriate sportspeople in Tunisia